The following tables list the main events in history of Zemun (part of Belgrade, Serbia).

Ancient times and Middle Ages

Historic rulers of Zemun up to 20th century

Early modern period

20th and 21st century

See also 

 Zemun
 Timeline of Belgrade history

References

Sources 

 Petar Marković - „Zemun od najstariji dana pa do danas“, Zemun, 1896; reprinted 2004, 
 „Hrvatska revija“ - „Hrvatska strana Zemuna“, 2004
 Statistical Office of Serbia - "Census in Serbia 2011 – First Results"

Zemun
History of Belgrade
History of Syrmia
Zemun